Eraric (died 541) was briefly King of the Ostrogoths, elected as the most distinguished among the Rugians in the confederation of the Ostrogoths. The Goths were vexed at the presumption of the Rugians, but nevertheless they recognized Eraric. He summoned a council directed to convincing the confederation to make peace with the Eastern Roman emperor Justinian, under Roman suzerainty. The Ostrogoths opposed the ceasefire under the negotiations, and they instead elected Ildibad's nephew Totila. Soon afterwards Eraric was killed by Totila's followers after a reign of five months.

References

External links
History of the later Roman Empire from the death of Theodosius I ..., Volume 2 by John Bagnell Bury.

6th-century kings of Italy
Ostrogothic kings
Rugian people
541 deaths
Assassinated Gothic people
6th-century murdered monarchs
6th-century rulers in Europe
6th-century Ostrogothic people
People of the Gothic War (535–554)
Year of birth unknown